Philip Poole Bradley (born March 11, 1959), is an American former professional baseball outfielder / designated hitter who played in Major League Baseball (MLB) for the American League (AL) Seattle Mariners, Baltimore Orioles, and Chicago White Sox, and  National League (NL) Philadelphia Phillies, from  to .

Career
Bradley played high school baseball and football in Macomb, Illinois for the Macomb High Bombers. Due to his success there, the Macomb High School baseball field was later dedicated in his name. Also a talented football player, he played college football at the University of Missouri in Columbia, Missouri and was their starting quarterback from 1978 through 1980.

One of the most decorated athletes in MU annals, Bradley lettered in football at MU from 1977–81, and in baseball in 1979-80-81. Bradley quarterbacked the Tigers to three bowl games. He was a three-time Big Eight Conference "Offensive Player of the Year" and set the conference total offense record at 6,459 yards which stood for 10 years. In baseball, he starred as an outfielder on MU teams that won the Big Eight championship in 1980, and went to the NCAA Tournament in 1980 and '81.

He was drafted by the Seattle Mariners in the third round of the 1981 amateur draft and made his Major League debut on September 2, 1983, as a pinch hitter against the New York Yankees.

Bradley became Seattle's regular left fielder in 1984, batting .301 in 124 games, but did not show any power, hitting no home runs and only three in his career in the minors to that point. In 1985, he hit .300 in 159 games, adding a surprising 26 home runs, and was selected to the American League All-Star team. Bradley was a productive player in Seattle, never hitting below .297 in four full seasons while also stealing 107 bases. On April 13, 1985, at home against pitcher Ron Davis of the Twins,  with two outs in the ninth inning, Bradley hit a walk-off grand slam home run to win by one run, becoming the third American League player to do so (ninth player in the majors).  On April 29, 1986, Bradley was Roger Clemens' 20th and final strikeout as the pitcher set a major league record for strikeouts in a game.

Bradley was dealt along with Tim Fortugno from the Mariners to the Philadelphia Phillies for Glenn Wilson, Mike Jackson and Dave Brundage at the Winter Meetings on December 9, 1987. He hit a respectable .264 in his only season with the Phillies. While with Philly, Bradley was hit by a pitch 16 times during the season which set a Phillies team record.

Bradley was acquired by the Baltimore Orioles for Ken Howell and Gordon Dillard on December 9, 1988, exactly one year to the day of his trade to Philadelphia. The transaction addressed the Orioles' need for right-handed hitting and the Phillies' for starting pitching. Back in the more familiar American League, his batting average rose to .277 in his first season in Baltimore. He was the starting left fielder and oldest everyday player with the "Why Not?" Orioles of which he said, "On paper, that was probably the worst team I ever played for and, as it turned out, it was the best team I ever played with."

After batting .270 (78 hits in 289 at-bats) with 4 home runs, 26 RBI and 10 stolen bases through the first four months of the 1990 season, Bradley was traded from the Orioles to the Chicago White Sox for Ron Kittle on July 30. His $1.15 million salary at the back end of a two-year contract was almost double the $550,000 that Kittle was earning. He had rejected the Orioles' one-year $1.3 million contract offer which he called "a humiliation" a week prior to the trade. Baltimore general manager Roland Hemond was criticized by the Daily Press for bringing on too many ex-White Sox like Kittle, Greg Walker, Kevin Hickey, Tim Hulett and Dave Gallagher. Bradley's final major league appearance came on September 29, 1990, as he drew two walks and scored a run in a 5-2 White Sox win over the Seattle Mariners.

Shortly after retirement, he was hired as the baseball coach at Westminster College in Fulton, Missouri. He also taught classes there, including upper-level classes on sports history.

In September 2009, Bradley was named as a volunteer assistant coach of the University of Missouri softball team for the 2009-10 season. He is currently a Special Assistant to the Executive Director for the Major League Baseball Players Association.

Career statistics

References

External links

Phil Bradley at Baseball Almanac

1959 births
Living people
African-American baseball coaches
African-American baseball players
African-American players of American football
American expatriate baseball players in Canada
American expatriate baseball players in Japan
American football quarterbacks
American League All-Stars
Bakersfield Mariners players
Baltimore Orioles players
Baseball coaches from Indiana
Baseball players from Indiana
Bellingham Mariners players
Chicago White Sox players
Edmonton Trappers players
Iowa Cubs players
Major League Baseball outfielders
Missouri Tigers softball coaches
Missouri Tigers baseball players
Missouri Tigers football players
People from Macomb, Illinois
Philadelphia Phillies players
Players of American football from Indiana
Salt Lake City Gulls players
Seattle Mariners players
Softball coaches from Indiana
Westminster Blue Jays baseball coaches
Yomiuri Giants players
21st-century African-American people
20th-century African-American sportspeople